Landeck-Zams railway station (formerly named Landeck) is a railway station on the Arlberg railway between Innsbruck and Bludenz in Tyrol, Austria. It is frequented by more than 2000 travellers a day, whereby a majority of them are commuters that are working or studying in Innsbruck.

Operation 

Beside its function as an important commuter station, Landeck-Zams also serves as an important station for the operations flow on the Arlberg line, since the ramp section of Europe's most difficult mountain railway (max. 26 ‰ on the east- and 31 ‰ on the west-ramp) starts in Landeck. Therefore, banking engines are often coupled (or decoupled) to heavy freight- or passenger trains. Even the Orient Express takes a short stop in Landeck for this reason.

Because of the single track design of the mountain section of the line, a closing between Bludenz and Landeck (sometimes Ötztal) can be necessary in exceptional cases (maintenance works or natural disasters). Passenger transport is then adopted by a rail replacement service. For this reason the station forecourt of Landeck is laid out for offering parking space to enough coaches if necessary.

Services

Rail services 
The most important connections are the bihourly running ÖBB-EuroCity trains from Basel and Zürich, respectively Bregenz to Wien Westbahnhof (Vienna West). Regional trains are only going eastbound to Innsbruck Hauptbahnhof and Hall in Tirol since the regional traffic between Landeck and St. Anton was completely abandoned and displaced by an improved coach service. Once a day there is also a connection to Dortmund or Münster in Germany.

In the winter season the station of Landeck is additionally frequented by ski-trains, predominantly from Denmark and the Netherlands. This trains are often stabled in Landeck for the holiday duration of their passengers.

Bus services 
From the station forecourt, which is equipped with a guidance system, are departing urban buses (Landeck–Landeck-Zams –Zams) as well as regional lines.

The following lines depart from Landeck-Zams:
Pians–Strengen–Flirsch–Pettneu am Arlberg–St. Anton am Arlberg 
Pians–See–Kappl–Ischgl–Galtür–Bielerhöhe
Prutz–Ried im Oberinntal–Tösens–Pfunds–(Martina, Switzerland: connection to Scuol )/Nauders: connection to Mals, Italy 
Prutz–Ried im Oberinntal–Ladis–Fiss–Serfaus
Zams–Schönwies–Mils bei Imst–Imst
Fließ
Grins
Stanz bei Landeck

See also 

Arlberg railway
Landeck

References 

Railway stations in Tyrol (state)
Landeck District
Railway stations opened in 1883